Raymond Molinier (1904–1994) was a leader of the Trotskyist movement in France and a pioneer of the Fourth International. 

Molinier was born in Paris.  In 1929, founded the journal La Vérité, and in March 1936 he and Pierre Frank co-founded the Parti communiste internationaliste, which merged with two other groups to form the Parti ouvrier internationaliste in June of that year. At the outbreak of World War II Molinier was abroad and only returned after the cessation of hostilities. He was later active with the Ligue communiste révolutionnaire (LCR). Eventuallly, he moved to Latin America were he worked as an agent for British intelligence services, under the name of "Leon Droeven".

References

1904 births
1994 deaths
Politicians from Paris
French Trotskyists